The first USS Silver Cloud was a steamer acquired by the Union Navy during the American Civil War.

She was used by the Union Navy as a gunboat in support of the Union Navy blockade of Confederate waterways.

Commissioned at Cairo, Illinois, in 1863 

Silver Cloud—a wooden-hulled stern wheel steamer built in 1862 at Brownsville, Pennsylvania, was taken over by the Navy on 1 April 1863 at Cairo, Illinois; commissioned there on 4 May 1863; and was formally purchased by the Navy on 19 May 1863.

Civil War operations

Assigned to the Mississippi Squadron 

The gunboat (Tinclad No. 28), commanded by Acting Master Augustus F. Thompson, joined the Mississippi Squadron after it had succeeded in opening the Mississippi River and its tributaries to navigation by Union ships—naval, military, and merchant. However, since the South was not yet beaten, it was still necessary for the ships to patrol the rivers to protect Union shipping from attacks by guerrilla bands.

Destroying boats along the Tennessee River 

Early in May 1863, her first assignment took her up the Tennessee River as far as Eastport, Mississippi, to destroy every boat found along the way which might be used by the Confederates to cross the river. The operation was completely successful and resulted in the capture of five officers, 40 men, 50 horses, as well as their arms, supplies, and equipment.
 
Such operations became almost routine for Silver Cloud during the almost two remaining years of the Civil War.

Conveying General Sherman from Memphis to Vicksburg 

Highlights of her service included another expedition up the Tennessee in July and an engagement with some 200 Confederate soldiers whom she drove away from Osceola, Arkansas. In mid-January 1864, she carried Gen. William Tecumseh Sherman from Memphis, Tennessee, to Vicksburg, Mississippi. On 14 April, she assisted  and Platte Valley in driving Confederate cavalry and infantry from Fort Pillow, Tennessee, which Major General Nathan Bedford Forrest had captured two days before. Late in May, she assisted , after that river monitor had run aground at Helena Bar, Arkansas.

Post-war operations 

After the Confederacy collapsed, Silver Cloud operated briefly on the rivers helping to return conditions to normal.

Decommissioning, sale, and subsequent maritime career 

She was decommissioned at Mound City, Illinois, on 13 July 1865 and was sold at public auction there on 17 August 1865 to J. H. Sterritt. The ship was converted from a stern to a side wheeler and redocumented on 7 October 1865. She was snagged and lost on 27 February 1866 in Buffalo Bayou, Texas.

See also

 Anaconda Plan

References

External links 
 Guide to the Officer Appointments and Orders of the USS Silver Cloud, 1862-1865 MS 395 held by Special Collection & Archives, Nimitz Library at the United States Naval Academy

Ships of the Union Navy
Ships built in Brownsville, Pennsylvania
Steamships of the United States Navy
Gunboats of the United States Navy
American Civil War patrol vessels of the United States
1862 ships